StarChase is the trade name of a less-than-lethal vehicle tagging system developed early in 2006 to tag, track and locate a fleeing vehicle of interest to police. Its components consist of an electronic tag in the form of a small, cylindrical projectile with the end covered in a viscous, industrial strength adhesive, which contains a battery-operated GPS tracker and Quad-Band transmitter (powered by a 1300 mAh dry cell), fired by compressed air from a small launcher on the front grille of a police car. In 2022,  the system was available in more than thirty states, and  Canada, and cost $5,000 to install, each bullet costing $500. The system was developed to reduce the need for, and the inherent danger of high speed pursuits.

Upon deployment to a target vehicle, the tag begins broadcasting its position to the dispatch center. Catching the vehicle, even without air support, now becomes a matter of strategic interdiction, rather than mere pursuit and interception.

The StarChase system, as of mid-2013 was in use by the Arizona Department of Public Safety, Los Angeles Sheriff's Department, Austin Police Department, and numerous other agencies all over the world, such as the Ontario Provincial Police.

See also 

 Real-time locating
 Real-time location services
 Automatic vehicle location

References 

http://www.nij.gov/nij/topics/law-enforcement/operations/pursuit/technology-developments.htm#remotetracking

External links 
 
Time Magazine: StarChase, one of the best inventions of 2007
The Early Show on CBS: High Tech Car Chases

Law enforcement equipment